La Loi de la jungle (literally The law of the Jungle; English title : Struggle for Life) is a 2016 French comedy film directed by Antonin Peretjatko. It stars Vincent Macaigne, Vimala Pons, Pascal Légitimus and Mathieu Amalric. The film is set in French Guiana.

Cast 
 Vincent Macaigne as Marc Châtaigne
 Vimala Pons as Tarzan
 Pascal Légitimus as Duplex
 Mathieu Amalric as Galgaric
 Jean-Luc Bideau as Rosio
 Fred Tousch as Friquelin
 Rodolphe Pauly as Damien
 Pascal Tagnati as Ulrich
 Thomas de Pourquery as Georges
 Philippe Laudenbach as De Rostiviec

References

External links 
 
 

2016 films
2016 comedy films
2010s French-language films
French comedy films
Films set in jungles
Films set in French Guiana
2010s French films